The suit of Cups is one of the four card suits used in Latin-suited playing cards alongside Coins, Swords and Batons. These suits are used in Spanish, Italian and some tarot card packs. 

Symbol on Italian pattern cards:    Symbol on Spanish pattern cards:  Symbol on French Aluette Spanish pattern cards:

Characteristics 
In Spain, the suit of Cups is known as copas and the court cards are known as the Rey (King), Caballo (Knight or Cavalier) and Sota (Knave or Valet). The Spanish play with packs of 40 or 48 cards. There are no Tens and, in the shorter pack, the Nines and Eights are also dropped. Thus the suit of Cups ranks: R C S (9 8) 7 6 5 4 3 2 1. In Italy the suit is known as coppe and the corresponding court cards are the Re, Cavallo and Fante. Either 40 or 52-card packs are used. In the shorter packs, the Tens, Nines and Eights are removed. Card ranking is thus: R C F (10 9 8) 7 6 5 4 3 2 1.

Individual cards 
 Seven of Cups. In Scopa the Seven of Cups, along with the other suit Sevens, is the highest-scoring card in the bonus of primiera.

The suit of Goblets, also known as cups, is one of several suits of some tarot packs used in cartomancy.

See also 
 Spanish playing cards
 Italian playing cards
 Cups - suit used in divinatory tarot cards

Notes and references

Literature

External links

Card suits